"I Remember" is a song by Australian rock and pop band The Badloves and released in May 1993 as the second single from the band's debut studio album Get On Board. The song peaked at number 48 in Australia.

Track listings
CD single (D12125)
 "I Remember" - 3:10	
 "Live" (Live) - 5:00
 "I Embarrass Myself" (Live) - 3:45

Ltd Edition CD Maxi (D12582)
 "I Remember" - 3:10
 "Lost" - 3:31
 "Stop" - 3:21
 "Live" (Live) - 5:00
 "I Embarrass Myself" (Live) - 3:45

Charts

References

1993 songs
1993 singles
Mushroom Records singles
The Badloves songs